The open formation skydiving event at the 2001 World Games in Akita was played from 17 to 19 August. 30 parachuters, from 6 nations, participated in the tournament. The competition took place at Ogata Athletic Field in Ōgata .

Competition format
A total of seven rounds were contested. The team with the most points is the winner.

Results

References

External links
 Results on IWGA website

Open formation skydiving